Mount Bethel Church is a Presbyterian church located at the junction of County Route 5 (Jersey Mountain Road) and County Route 5/4 (Three Churches Hollow Road) in the unincorporated community of Three Churches north of Romney in Hampshire County, West Virginia, United States.

History 
In 1792, a group of Presbyterians established a church near Mount Bethel's current location. It was first called the Mountain Church in 1808 and soon became the center of Presbyterian work in Hampshire County under the auspices of the Reverend John Lyle. The Reverend James Black reorganized the congregation in 1812 and it was renamed Mount Bethel. The present church, built of logs in 1837, is the oldest house of worship in Hampshire County.

See also
List of historic sites in Hampshire County, West Virginia

References

External links 

Landmarks in West Virginia
Churches in Hampshire County, West Virginia
Presbyterian churches in West Virginia
Churches completed in 1837
19th-century Presbyterian church buildings in the United States
Vernacular architecture in West Virginia